This is a list of the state-level legislative councils of Venezuela.

Legislative Authority is exercised in each State by a Legislative Council, consisting of no more than fifteen and at least seven members, who proportionally represent the population of the State and the Municipalities. The Legislative Council has the following powers:(1) To legislate matters within state competence.

(2) Pass the state's Budget Law.

(3) Any others vested in it by this Constitution or by the law.State legislators are elected for a four-year term, eligible for reelection for only two terms.

List

External links
 CityMayors feature

State legislatures of Venezuela
State legislatures of Venezuela
States of Venezuela